This is a list of radio stations with German language broadcasts.

Austrian radio stations 
See: List of radio stations in Austria and Liechtenstein

ORF (Österreichischer Rundfunk / Austrian Broadcasting) 
 National
 Ö1 (Classical Music)
 Ö3 (Contemporary)
 FM4 (Youth, part English and part German language)
 International
 Radio Österreich 1 International (via Short Wave)
 Radio 1476 (Cultural, AM)

Commercial stations 
 Krone Hit Radio (FM)
 Energy Wien 104.2 (FM)

Community radio stations 
 Radiofabrik 107.5 and 97.3 MHz (FM)

German radio stations

ARD
 NDR (Norddeutscher Rundfunk / North German Broadcasting)
Target area: Northern Germany (Hamburg, Lower Saxony, Schleswig-Holstein, Mecklenburg-Western Pomerania)
 NDR 1 (Oldies), completely different versions for each state.
 NDR 2 (Adult Contemporary)
NDR 90,3 (State program for Hamburg)
NDR Blue (Music off the charts)
 NDR Kultur (Classical music, culture)
 NDR Info (News and information, culture)
NDR Info Spezial (Information with live breaks)
NDR Schlager (Schlager music)
 N-Joy (Youth)
 Radio Bremen

 Bremen Eins (Oldies)
Bremen Zwei (culture, information)
Bremen Next (youth)
 Bremen Vier (Youth)
 WDR (Westdeutscher Rundfunk / West German Broadcasting)
Target area: North Rhine-Westphalia
 1LIVE (Youth)
1LIVE diggi (youth)
COSMO (cooperation with radiobremen and rbb)
 WDR 2 (Adult Contemporary)
 WDR 3 (Classical music, culture)
 WDR 4 (Oldies)
 WDR 5 (News and information, culture)
WDR Event (event program)
WDR Vera (traffic information)

 SR (Saarländischer Rundfunk / Saarland Broadcasting)
 Antenne Saar (information)
SR 1 (Contemporary)
 SR 2 Kulturradio (Culture)
 SR 3 Saarlandwelle (Traditional music)
 Unserding (Youth)
 RBB (Rundfunk Berlin-Brandenburg / Broadcasting of Berlin-Brandenburg)
 radioeins (accompanying program)
 rbb 88,8
 Antenne Brandenburg
 Fritz (Youth)
 Inforadio (information)
 rbbKultur (culture)
 MDR (Mitteldeutscher Rundfunk / Central German Broadcasting)
Target area: Saxony, Saxony-Anhalt, Thuringia;
 MDR Sachsen
 MDR Sputnik (Youth)
 MDR Jump (Adult Contemporary)
MDR Klassik (classical music)
 MDR Kultur (Culture)
 MDR aktuell (News and information)
MDR Schlagerwelt (Schlager music)
MDR Tweens (kids program)
 HR (Hessischer Rundfunk / Hessian Broadcasting)
 hr1 (Oldies, information)
 hr2 (Culture, classical music)
 hr3 (Adult Contemporary)
 hr4 (Traditional music)
 hr-info (information)
 You FM (Youth)
 SWR (Südwestrundfunk / Southwest Broadcasting)
Target area: Baden-Württemberg and Rhineland-Palatinate
 SWR1 (Oldies), during the day different versions for each state.
 SWR2 (Culture)
 SWR3 (Adult Contemporary)
 SWR4 (Traditional music), during the day different versions for each state.
 Dasding (Youth)
 SWR aktuell (news and information)
 BR (Bayerischer Rundfunk / Bavarian Broadcasting)
 Bayern 1 (Oldies)
 Bayern 2 (Culture, information)
 Bayern 3 (Adult Contemporary)
 BR Heimat (folk music)
 BR-Klassik (Classical Music)
 BR24 (News non stop)
 BR24live
BR Schlager (Schlager music)
BR Verkehr (traffic information)
 Puls (alternative music/youth)
 National radio stations
 Deutschlandfunk (News- and Cultural programme, FM, MW, LW, SW)
 Deutschlandradio Kultur (Cultural programme, FM, MW, LW, SW)
Deutschlandfunk Nova (Youth radio, FM, MW, LW, SW)

Commercial stations

National
 RTL Radio (FM)
 Klassik Radio (FM)
 Jam FM
 Radio Melodie (FM)
 sunshine live (FM)
 Evangeliums-Rundfunk (religious, AM)

Regional (by federal states)
 Schleswig-Holstein
 Delta Radio (FM)
 Radio Nora (FM)
 Radio Schleswig-Holstein (FM)
 Power 612 (AM) disfunct
 Hamburg
 Radio Hamburg (FM)
 alster radio (FM)
 Oldie 95 (FM)
 Energy Hamburg 97.1 (FM)
 Bremen
 Energy Bremen (FM)
 Lower Saxony
 Radio ffn (FM)
 Hit-Radio Antenne (FM)
 Radio 21 (FM)
 Mecklenburg-Western Pomerania
 80s80s MV (FM)
 Ostseewelle HIT-RADIO Mecklenburg-Vorpommern (FM)
 North Rhine-Westphalia
 Radio NRW (More than 40 local and noncommercial radio stations) (FM)
 Radio Q (Münster) (FM)
 Eldoradio (Dortmund) (FM)
 Radio Kiepenkerl Dülmen
 Schlager-Radio Hilden
 Rhineland-Palatinate
 RPR 1. (FM)
 big FM (FM)
 Rockland Radio (FM)
 Antenne West (FM)
 Antenne Koblenz (FM)
 Saarland
 Radio Salü (FM)
 big FM (FM)
 Europe 1 (located in Felsberg-Berus, LW)
 Baden-Württemberg
 statewide
 Hit-Radio Antenne 1 (located in Stuttgart, FM)
 big FM (located in Stuttgart, FM)
 Radio Regenbogen (located in Mannheim, FM)
 Radio 7 (located in Ulm, FM)
 local
 Radio Ton (located in Heilbronn, local station for Württembergisch-Franken, Ostwürttemberg and Neckar-Alb, FM)
 Hit 1 (located in and local station for Karlsruhe, FM)
 Energy Stuttgart (located in Waiblingen, local station for the northern part of Stuttgart, FM)
 Die Neue 107.7 Nonstop Pop und Rock (local station for the eastern part of Stuttgart, FM)
 Donau 3 FM (located in Ulm local station for the Donau-Iller region, FM)
 R.TV Radio (located in Böblingen, local station of the southwest region of Stuttgart / Freudenstadt, FM)
 Hitradio Ohr, (located in Offenburg, FM)
 , (located in Freiburg, local station for southern Baden, FM)
 Radio Neckarburg, (located in Eschbronn, local station for Schwarzwald-Baar, FM)
 Radio Seefunk, (located in Konstanz, FM)
 Radio VHR (24h Livestream, Schlager und Volksmusik Hitradio, www.radio-vhr.de)
 Bavaria
 Antenne Bayern (FM)
 Energy München 93.3 (FM)
 Energy Nürnberg (FM)
 Radio Galaxy (FM)
 Radio Gong 96.3 (FM)
 Radio Charivari (FM)
 Hitradio RT1 96.7 FM (FM)
 RSA Radio Allgäu (FM)
 BLR (FM)
 Hesse
 Hit Radio FFH (FM)
 planet more music radio (FM)
 harmony.fm (FM)
 Radio Bob! (FM)
 Main FM (FM)
 Thuringia
 Antenne Thüringen (FM)
 Landeswelle Thüringen (FM)
 Radio TOP 40 (FM)
 Saxony
 statewide
 Radio PSR (FM)
 Hitradio RTL (FM)
 Energy Sachsen s. NRJ (FM)
 R.SA (FM)
 Apollo Radio (FM)
 local
 Radio Dresden (local station for Dresden, FM)
 Radio Leipzig (local station for Leipzig, FM)
 Radio Chemnitz (local station for Chemnitz, FM)
 Radio Lausitz (local station for Lusatia (Lausitz), FM)
 Radio Zwickau (local station for Zwickau, FM)
 Radio Erzgebirge (local station for Erzgebirge, FM)
 Vogtlandradio (local station for Vogtland, FM)
 Radio Erzgebirge 107.7 (FM)
 Saxony-Anhalt
 Radio SAW (FM)
 89.0 RTL (FM)
 Radio Brocken (FM)
 Rockland Sachsen-Anhalt (FM)
 Berlin / Brandenburg
 94.5 Radio Cottbus, local in South Brandenburg (FM)
 Radio 98.2 Paradiso (FM)
 104.6 RTL, s. RTL Group (FM)
 104.9 OldieStar Radio (FM, DVB-T)
 Berlin aktuell (closed, formerly FM)
 BB Radio (FM)
 Berliner Rundfunk 91.4 (FM)
 BluRadio (FM)
 Charlie 87.9, (closed, formerly FM)
 94.3 r.s.2, formerly RIAS 2 (FM)
 Elsterwelle, locally in South Brandenburg and North Saxony (FM)
 Energy Berlin, s. NRJ (FM)
 Flux FM 100.6 (formerly Motor FM, FM)
 Jazz Radio 101.9 (FM)
 98.8 Kiss FM (FM)
 Metropol FM (FM)
 Motor FM (FM)
 Power Radio, local in Northeast Berlin (FM)
 Radio Power 4, local in Northeast Brandenburg (closed, formerly FM)
 Radio Russkij Berlin, for Russian community (FM)
 Radio Teddy, children programmes (FM)
 Sender KW, local in Southeast Berlin (FM)
 105.5 Spreeradio (FM)
 star FM 87.9 maximum rock! (FM)

Civilian Radio

Education and (open) Civilian Radios (Ausbildungs- und offener Bürgerkanal) are non commercial radios with free access to the medium radio for training media competences (e.g. for students, school classes or individuals (e.g. voluntairs)).
 see Non Commercial local radio (German Wikipedia)

Liberal Radio

Liberal radio is non commercial and part of private radio for groups, local bands, civilian initiatives and single persons with (free) access to the medium radio. One of the main target of "Liberal radio" is to create a public opposition.
 see Liberal Radio (German Wikipedia)

Swiss radio stations 
See: List of radio stations in Switzerland
 SRF (SRG SSR idée suisse)
 Radio SRF 1
 Radio SRF 2 Kultur (Classical Music)
 Radio SRF 3
 Radio SRF 4 News (News)
 Radio SRF Virus (Youth)
 Radio SRF Musikwelle (News and traditional music)
 Radio Swiss Pop
 Radio Swiss Jazz
 Radio Swiss Classic
 Association Of Swiss Internet Radio

Other radio stations 
 DW-Radio (Voice of Germany, International broadcasting in 30 languages, with a full-time program in German and English on Shortwave)
 Rai Sender Bozen, radio station based in Bolzano, Italy

See also 
 List of German language television channels

External links 
 FMLIST database of FM stations (select country "D" or "AUT", "SUI" after logging in or continuing as guest)
 FMSCAN radio reception prediction (enter a location and start generating a list of stations)
 Radio Stations Germany database of German radio stations (you can listen to these stations online)

German